Alto is an unincorporated community in Richland Parish, Louisiana, United States.

Etymology
Alto was likely named due to its lofty elevation.

References

Unincorporated communities in Richland Parish, Louisiana
Unincorporated communities in Louisiana